Gilbert James Allis ( 1879–1932) was a philatelist who was a specialist in the stamps of southern Africa. In 1931, he was awarded the Crawford Medal by the Royal Philatelic Society London for his work Cape of Good Hope: Its postal history & postage stamps. He was the President of the Cape Town Philatelic Society and the first signatory to the Roll of Distinguished Philatelists of South Africa.

Selected publications
Cape of Good Hope: Its postal history & postage stamps. London: Stanley Gibbons, 1930.

References

1870s births
1932 deaths
Year of birth uncertain
Philatelists
Philately of South Africa